Moonlight is the reflected light that comes to Earth from the Moon.

Moonlight may also refer to:

Places
 Moonlight, Indiana
 Moonlight, Kansas
 Moonlight, Virginia

Arts, entertainment, and media

Films
 Moonlight (1932 film), a French comedy
 Moonlight (2002 film), a Dutch thriller
 Moonlight (2016 film), an American drama; winner of Best Picture Oscar

Literature
 Moonlight (play), by Harold Pinter
 Moonlight, a novel in the Dark Guardian series by Rachel Hawthorne

Music
 Moonlight (band), a Polish gothic/progressive metal band

Albums
 Moonlight, a 2021 album by L'Algérino
 Moonlight, an album by Plastic Tree 
 Moonlight, an  album by Hanni El Khatib
 Moonlight, an album by Steve Cole
 Moonlight (EP), by Candy Coded

Songs
 "Moonlight" (Bob Dylan song)
 "Moonlight" (Barry Gibb song), later recorded by Jerry Vale
 "Moonlight" (MAX song)
 "Moonlight" (Grace VanderWaal song)
 "Moonlight" (XXXTentacion song)
 "Moonlight" a song by Sting from the 1995 film Sabrina
 "Moonlight", a song by Ariana Grande from the album Dangerous Woman
 "Moonlight", a song by Jay-Z from the album 4:44
 "Moonlight", a composition by Kenny G from the album The Moment
 "Moonlight (A Vampire's Dream)", a song by Stevie Nicks from her album In Your Dreams
 Moonlight Sonata, the popular name of Beethoven's Piano Sonata No. 14

Other arts and media
 Moonlight (painting), 1777, by Philip James de Loutherbourg
 Moonlight (American TV series), an American paranormal romance drama
Moonlight (Chinese TV series), a 2021 Chinese romantic comedy television series

Other uses
 Moonlight (runtime), a Linux implementation of the Microsoft Silverlight web application framework
 Moonlight (shipwreck), in Lake Superior
 MoonLIGHT, a laser reflector once planned to be placed near the Moon's south pole
 Moonlight initiative, an initiative by the European Space Agency expanding satellite navigation and communication links to the Moon.

See also
 "Moonlight Serenade", a 1939 song by Glenn Miller
 Light (disambiguation)
 Lighting
 Moon (disambiguation)
 Moonbeam (disambiguation)
 Moonglow (disambiguation)
 Moonglows
 MoonLITE, a proposed British space mission
 Moonlight Sonata (disambiguation)
 Moonlighting (disambiguation)
 Moonray (disambiguation)
 Moonshine (disambiguation)
 Mr. Moonlight (disambiguation)
 Clair de Lune (disambiguation)